Lieutenant General Michael James Holden is a fictional character from the Lifetime television series Army Wives, portrayed by Brian McNamara.

Fictional biography
Michael was married to Claudia Joy Holden for 25 years. They met while Claudia Joy was studying at Harvard University and after Michael had graduated from West Point. He and Claudia Joy have known the Sherwoods for a long time; he and Frank first met while based at Fort Carson and were reunited twice, at Fort Bliss and now Fort Marshall. Their children grew up together and have known each since elementary school.

Michael and Claudia Joy have two teenage daughters, Amanda Joy and Emmalin Jane. Amanda was born while he was in Kuwait during the Gulf War. Amanda was killed in a bombing that took place during the first season's finale.

Claudia Joy and Michael are the godparents of Joan and Roland Burton's daughter, Sara Elizabeth, and to Frank and Denise Sherwood's daughter Molly Victoria.

He enjoys fishing and hunting.

Career
At the start of the series Michael held the rank of colonel. He had been on course for a promotion but was passed over due to false allegations of racism. He is promoted to brigadier general and becomes the base commander in the Season 1 finale after General Baker retired following a brain aneurysm. After one year of being Brigadier General, Michael is offered a job at NATO in Brussels. He accepts but returns to Fort Marshall after only a few months due to a "reshuffling" and is instead made commander of the 23rd Airborne Division. He receives his second star at the end of Season 3. When the 23rd was disbanded and Fort Marshall slated for closure, he was to be transferred to The Pentagon as a G-3 in the Army Staff but considered retiring as he did not want to end his career "commanding a desk". He also hoped to let Claudia Joy have her own career as an attorney. However, due to the unexpected turnaround of events, Fort Marshall remained open and he is named commander of the fictional XVII Airborne Corps, the formation to which the 32nd and recently disbanded 23rd Airborne Divisions belong. In season 6 episode 13, he receives word of his third star and in episode 19 he is seen wearing 3 stars for the first time.

Awards and citations
The following are the medals and service awards fictionally worn by General Holden.

Casting and creation
Explaining how he landed the role of Michael Holden, Brian McNamara said: "Apparently Katherine Fugate and April Webster had been looking for [someone to play] the role of Michael for quite a while. I was called in at the Nth hour, and Katherine felt that she'd finally found the actor to do it. I'm so grateful. I love playing Michael." McNamara based his portrayal of the character on his brother, a retired navy captain, and on Major General Tony Cucolo, commander of the 3rd Infantry Division from 2008 to 2011.

Reception
Reviewing an episode of the second season, Andy Asensio of Zap2it wrote: "Michael is basically the nicest, sweetest guy ever. He's a wonderful guy. But is that necessarily what an Army post needs in a commander? This is a guy who gets really emotional about signing orders for soldiers to deploy, who tears up upon hearing that his second-in-command is pregnant, and who is overwhelmed by regret about the way he handled a recent decision as commander."

References

External links
 Michael Holden at Lifetime

Army Wives characters
Television characters introduced in 2007
Fictional colonels
Fictional brigadier generals
Fictional major generals
Fictional lieutenant generals
Fictional Gulf War veterans
Fictional Yugoslav War veterans
Fictional War in Afghanistan (2001–2021) veterans
Fictional United States Army personnel